XHEVE-FM is a radio station on 93.3 FM in Colima City, Colima, Mexico owned by Radiorama and carrying its La Luperrona format.

History
XHEVE began as XEVE-AM 960 (later 1020), with a concession awarded to Comunicación y Cultura, S.A., on June 12, 1990. It was sold to Grupo ACIR in 1996 and migrated to FM in 2011.

Sometime after, it was sold to Radiorama and now broadcasts its La Luperrona format after a stint as La Más Picuda. The concession was transferred in 2015.

References

Radio stations in Colima